"Love Me" is a song by German singer Lena Meyer-Landrut, co-written by her and entertainer Stefan Raab. It was one of three songs performed by Meyer-Landrut in the final of Unser Star für Oslo (Our Star for Oslo), the national pre-selection programme for Germany's entry to the Eurovision Song Contest 2010. However, the audience chose "Satellite" to be her designated song for the contest in Oslo. "Love Me" was made available for digital download on 13 March 2010 and is also featured on Meyer-Landrut's maxi single "Satellite". The song subsequently charted in Germany, Austria and Switzerland, reaching peak positions of #4, #28 and #39 respectively.

"Love Me" is from Meyer-Landrut's debut album My Cassette Player, which was released on 7 May 2010.

Track listing

Credits and personnel
Lead vocals – Lena Meyer-Landrut
Producers – Stefan Raab
Music – Stefan Raab
Lyrics –  Lena Meyer-Landrut
Label: USFO for Universal Deutschland

Chart performance

References

2010 singles
Lena Meyer-Landrut songs
Songs written by Stefan Raab
Song recordings produced by Stefan Raab
2010 songs
Songs written by Lena Meyer-Landrut